Lingura is a commune in Cantemir District, Moldova. It is composed of three villages: Crăciun, Lingura and Popovca.

References

Communes of Cantemir District